Khirganga National Park is a national park in Himachal Pradesh, India established in 2010.    

Khirganga National Park is located at an altitude of 5500 meters.   

Tourists are led on to trespass the trail leading from the centre of the park from where it is easier to spot the exotic and rich flora and fauna.

References

2010 establishments in Himachal Pradesh
Protected areas established in 2010
Protected areas of Himachal Pradesh
National parks in Himachal Pradesh